Semper's lipinia (Lipinia semperi) is a species of skink found in the Philippines.

References

Lipinia
Reptiles described in 1867
Taxa named by Wilhelm Peters